Fei Liang (1936 – 4 June 2022) was a Chinese herpetologist.

Biography
Fei was admitted to Sichuan Agricultural University in 1956 where he majored in animal husbandry. In total, he discovered over 126 new species.

Fei Liang died in Chengdu on 4 June 2022.

References

1936 births
2022 deaths
Chinese herpetologists
Sichuan Agricultural University alumni
People from Chengdu
Date of birth missing